Se permettete parliamo di donne (internationally released as Let's Talk About Women)  is a 1964 Italian comedy film. It  represents the directorial debut of  Ettore Scola. The film consists of nine segments, all played by Vittorio Gassman.

Cast 
 Vittorio Gassman: Straniero / Practical Joker / Cliente / Amante / Amante impaziente / Cameriere / Fratello timido / Rigattiere / Prigioniero 
 Sylva Koscina: Ragazza  
 Antonella Lualdi: Fidanzata 
 Walter Chiari: Alfredo 
 Giovanna Ralli: female escort
 Jeanne Valérie: moglie del prigioniero 
 Eleonora Rossi Drago: signora annoiata
 Maria Fiore: Fearful Wife 
 Attilio D'Ottesio: Prison Official
 Edda Ferronao: Willing Maid 
 Olga Romanelli: Distraught Mother 
 Mario Brega 
 Gigi Proietti
 Mario Brega
 Riccardo Garrone  
 Marco Tulli
 Thea Fleming as Isabella Biancini: girl at Polo Club

References

External links

1964 films
Commedia all'italiana
Films directed by Ettore Scola
Films set in Sicily
Films set in Rome
Films shot in Rome
Films with screenplays by Ruggero Maccari
Films scored by Armando Trovajoli
Italian anthology films
1964 comedy films
Films with screenplays by Ettore Scola
1960s Italian-language films
1960s Italian films